The Polaroid Impulse is a camera produced by Polaroid Corporation between 1988 and 1994. The camera uses Polaroid's 600-series integral film. The Impulse is distinguished from Polaroid's other 600-series cameras by its always-on flash, binocular-style grips, larger viewfinder, and self-timer (autofocus models only).

Models 
The Polaroid Impulse was manufactured with two different lens configurations. The first featured a fixed-focus lens (sometimes paired with a secondary close-up lens), while the second featured Polaroid's sonar autofocus system. Both configurations were released under a variety of names in gray, black, yellow, blue, green, and magenta colorways.

*Some versions of the Impulse AF include a remote control port, compatible with the Polaroid Spectra System Remote Control.

References

External links
Polaroid Impulse at The Land List: SX-70 Cameras (fan site)

Impulse
Instant cameras